Ferry Moniaga (born 14 September 1949) is an Indonesian boxer. He competed in the men's bantamweight event at the 1972 Summer Olympics.

References

External links
 

1949 births
Living people
Indonesian male boxers
Olympic boxers of Indonesia
Boxers at the 1972 Summer Olympics
People from the Riau Islands
Asian Games medalists in boxing
Boxers at the 1970 Asian Games
Boxers at the 1974 Asian Games
Asian Games bronze medalists for Indonesia
Medalists at the 1970 Asian Games
Southeast Asian Games medalists in boxing
Bantamweight boxers
20th-century Indonesian people
21st-century Indonesian people